Envoy or Envoys may refer to:

Diplomacy
 Diplomacy, in general
 Envoy (title)
 Special envoy, a type of diplomatic rank

Brands
Airspeed Envoy, a 1930s British light transport aircraft
Envoy (automobile), an automobile brand used to sell British built Vauxhall and Bedford vehicles in the Canadian market
Envoy (WordPerfect), a document reader and document file format
Envoy Air, a United States regional airline
GMC Envoy, a make of automobile
Motorola Envoy,  a personal digital assistant released by Motorola in summer 1994
Envoy, web-service–proxy software that is part of Cloud Native Computing Foundation
Envoy, the call sign for United Kingdom airline Flyjet

Culture
Envoy, A Review of Literature and Art, an Irish magazine
 The Envoy (Gavilán Rayna Russom album), 2019
 The Envoy (Polonskaya novel), a 1989 Russian novel by Elizaveta Polonskaya
 The Envoy (Warren Zevon album), 1982
 The Envoy, a 2008 spy novel by Edward Wilson
 Der Gesandte (The Envoy), a 1991 play by the Swiss playwright Thomas Hürlimann
"Envoys", 2020 episode of Star Trek: Lower Decks
 L'envoi a chapter in Hemingway's short story collection In Our Time of 1925

Other uses
A  character in the Wild Cards anthology series
 "Envoys" (Star Trek: Lower Decks), an episode of Star Trek: Lower Decks

See also
Envoi, a short stanza at the end of a poem